Gregory R. Ball (born September 16, 1977) is a former American politician from 2006 to 2014 (now a business executive), former active duty U.S. Air Force officer and member of the New York State Senate and the New York State Assembly. He is a resident of Fredericksburg, Texas.

Early career and background

Ball was born on September 16, 1977 in Pawling, New York, and grew up on Quaker Hill. In 1996, he was awarded the Falcon Foundation Scholarship and attended the Valley Forge Military Academy before receiving an appointment to the United States Air Force Academy. While at the United States Air Force Academy, Ball interned in the White House Drug Policy Office.

At the Air Force Academy, Ball received a Bachelor of Science in Government in 2001. He started a Masters in International Affairs at Georgetown University in 2004 and was a fellow at the Center for the Study of the Presidency from 2002 to 2003.

USAF service
Ball was commissioned as a Lieutenant in the United States Air Force and requested an assignment with the Air Force Academy's Diversity Recruitment Office, and was posted in Philadelphia for a one-year tour working as a Minority Admissions Officer. Ball was then assigned to the  11th Wing at Bolling Air Force Base in Washington, D.C., as protocol officer. The Ceremonies & Protocol office was responsible for planning, organizing and developing projects for the Secretary of the Air Force and the Air Force Chief of Staff, as well as coordinating honor guard burial services at Arlington National Cemetery.

During his time in the Ceremonies & Protocol Office, Ball was a Project Officer for numerous events. The largest may have been the 2003 Global Air Chief's Conference, the first since 1997, for which he rented a cruise ship for a welcome reception in Washington, D.C., for dignitaries attending the Global Air Chiefs Conference.

As a lieutenant, Ball was charged with directing National Hispanic Heritage Month in 2002, 2003, and 2004. He organized exhibits and demonstrations to recognize the contributions made by Hispanic countries and cultures, and hosted Alberto Gonzales, then White House Counsel, in 2003. In 2003, Ball was nominated as "Military Volunteer of the Year" for the 11th Wing. He was awarded an Air Force Achievement Medal for outstanding service by General John P. Jumper and was honorably discharged from active duty in January 2005, with the rank of captain.

Business career
Upon his separation from active duty, Ball was recruited by the Antioch, Illinois, based Exceed International, a commercial development corporation with a presence in India, Turkey and Tunisia. Placed in charge of the marketing department, he served as a team member with the Company President on a 38-company executive mission to an economic summit in New Delhi, which included representatives from companies such as Amex, Cargill, New York Life, Dow Chemical, General Electric, Bechtel, and Cognizant.<ref>
Germain, David. "U.S.-India Business Council Mounts 38-Company 4-City Executive Mission to India". US Newswire. March 2, 2007.</ref> Later, Exceed invested $11.1 million in India to expand operations. Construction began on six projects in Chennai, which included the ESPEE IT Park, and the Bascon Technology Park, which helped Exceed establish a foothold in India.Ramesh, M. "US construction co Exceed bags 6 projects in Chennai". Business Line. November 20, 2004. The company also invested as a joint venture partner in mixed use residential projects such as a water treatment facility.

Eventually, Ball was elevated to Vice President of Exceed's Northeastern United States division and returned to New York. The Illinois based developer employs nearly 400 people in various fields such as project management, development, architecture, engineering, construction, government relations, finance, and technology.Kuyper, Diana. "Retail, condos encouraged". News Sun. October 11, 2005. In 2006, Exceed proposed a $75 million urban renewal project for the village of Brewster which would generate some $2 million a year in tax revenue for the town. The village's Mayor noted that "All of the infrastructure work recently completed by defining our identity within the watershed has paid off. Brewster finds itself in a situation where people are eagerly interested in working with the village in partnership to see our village revitalized".

Political career
In early 2005, Ball announced his candidacy for State Assembly as a Republican and stated he would attempt to unseat the incumbent Assemblyman Will Stephens in a primary."Pawling man seeks GOP support for Assembly". Poughkeepsie Journal. May 31, 2005. Stephens' family had held the seat nearly continuously for eighty years: his grandfather, D. Mallory Stephens, represented the district from 1926 to 1952; his father, Willis Stephens Sr., held the seat from 1952 to 1982; and Stephens himself served from 1994 to 2006. Ball received over $110,000 in campaign contributions for the race."New Yorkers on the Ball. 2006 July Periodic Report Summary Page". New York State Board of Elections. Retrieved on February 24, 2008.  He was placed on the primary ballot by the signature of over 1800 petitioners."Pawling man sets his sights on state Assembly seat". Poughkeepsie Journal. April 27, 2005.

In 2004, while living in D.C., Ball created a charity polo event for underprivileged youth known as the Courage Cup, which presented $10,000 to charities in 2005. The Courage Cup was also investigated by the Washington Post after allegations that Ball was diverting funds from the charity to his political campaigns. The Poughkeepsie Journal noted that Ball's political action committee made a donation to the Courage Cup charity for the use of the tent at the event. The group then solicited funds for Ball in the tent, an activity the assemblyman said was "perfectly legal and above-board.".

At times Ball's campaign was noted for its unorthodoxy.  Ball himself dressed up in a chicken suit and followed around Stephens after the incumbent refused to debate him.
On September 12, 2006, in the Republican Primary for New York's 99th District, Ball defeated Stephens in a landslide with 70.4% (5,165 votes) to 29.6% (2,176 votes) for Stephens, the lowest vote total for any incumbent running for reelection to the State Assembly that day. Stephens drew criticism when he refused to repudiate a letter about challenger Greg Ball which falsely claimed Mr. Ball had received a dishonorable discharge from the United States Air Force."Foe questions ethics of assemblyman's mailing". Poughkeepsie Journal. March 8, 2006.

According to a 2006 interview, Ball's ultimate political ambition is to become the Governor of New York State.

New York State Assembly (2007–2010)
Ball has stated that "since my election victory, we have made extraordinary progress by elevating the debate on tough issues like taxes, illegal immigration and dysfunction in Albany.""GOP legislators tout 'Road to Reform'". Poughkeepsie Journal. April 21, 2007. He was sworn into office on January 8, 2007."Valley Republicans take Assembly oath". Poughkeepsie Journal. January 3, 2007. The first time Ball rose to speak in the Assembly chamber, he called the legislature "dysfunctional", and withstood boos from his colleagues. The next day, Governor Spitzer called Ball to express support for his sentiments."Newcomer Ball slowly learns ropes". Poughkeepsie Journal. January 17, 2007.

Ball stated that "It was not easy getting up as the new guy and standing up to tell a group of people what they don't want to hear" but his speech became so popular that soon dozens of reporters began calling, he appeared on Fox News, excerpts from the floor speech popped up on numerous political blogs, his campaign web site received so many visits that its server crashed, and, a YouTube video of his remarks was ranked 80th among new videos the day it was uploaded."Colleagues boo freshman during scolding of Assembly". Poughkeepsie Journal. February 8, 2007. Although the remarks were contentious, they echoed a fifty-six page study from the nonpartisan New York University School of Law's Brennan Center for Justice, which referred to the legislature as "the least deliberative and most dysfunctional in the nation".

As ranking member of the Veterans Affairs Committee, Ball announced legislation expanding the eligibility for veterans to receive tax exemption benefits, including the exemption of real property owned by certain disabled veterans from property taxation. Ball authored the bill that created the tuition remission program for veterans, offering them free tuition at both SUNY and CUNY undergraduate and graduate institutions.Scott, Larry. "COMBAT VETS, GOING BACK TO VIETNAM, TO GET FREE TUITION AT N.Y. STATE UNIVERSITIES ". VA Watchdog. April 16, 2008. Governor Eliot Spitzer included the measure in his 2008 executive budget proposal, and the measure was kept funded in Governor David Paterson's version.

According to The Journal News, one key to Ball's success was that his campaign identified the concern local voters cared most about: illegal immigration. The New York Sun reported that Ball, who has called for some local prison and police officials to be trained by Immigration and Customs Enforcement to help deport illegal immigrants, defines himself as a moderate on the immigration issue. Ball made illegal immigration a focal point of his bid for office. In October 2007, he strongly criticized Governor Spitzer's plan to give driver's licenses to illegal immigrants.Blain, Glenn. "Assembly GOP takes aim at Spitzer license plan". The Journal News. October 1, 2007. He was at the forefront of the opposition to the plan, and his Statewide petition to stop it led to the Assembly Minority Conference's decision to sue the Governor to stop the plan.

thumb|At his Pawling, New York, campaign headquarters, Assemblyman Ball and campaign volunteers gear up for his reelection bid in May 2008.Ball has worked to promote businesses that hire legal immigrant laborers, and has begun to create a database for usage on his campaign website. His campaign headquarters in Pawling  may have been targeted over the contentious issue, and was vandalized with swastikas in October 2006, although the person or persons responsible misspelled the word "Fascist" twice.Risinit, Mike. "Definitely a trick". The Journal News. November 1, 2006. An oft-quoted line from his campaign literature was that "Illegal Immigration is Illegal".Risinit, Mike. "Assemblyman Ball discusses illegal immigration and public safety". The Journal News. December 13, 2007.

2008 election
Ball was referred to as "one of the rising stars in the Republican Party" during speculation that he would run against freshman Congressman John Hall in 2008, although he later ruled out a challenge against Hall.Risinit, Mike. "Ball may run for House seat". The Journal News. December 17, 2007. In early May 2008, John Degnan, the former Mayor of Brewster, New York, announced he would be mounting a challenge to the freshman Assemblyman. In the September 9th, 2008 primary, Ball won the primary by a 3 to 1 margin amongst Republicans.Gross, Eric. "Ball by a landslide". Putnam County Courier. September 10, 2008. He again faced Degnan, who had the Democratic nomination, in the general election, and was re-elected with 60% of the vote."Ball beats Degnan easily, but tensions persist". News 12 Networks. September 10, 2008.Rojas, Marcela. "Ball defeats Degnan by 3-to-1 margin". Poughkeepsie Journal. September 10, 2008.

Feud with State Senator Vincent Leibell
In July 2010, State Senator Vincent Leibell blamed Ball for a raid of the Senator's home which was conducted by the Federal Bureau of Investigation. The Senator was later arrested, tried, and convicted on several counts of Federal corruption charges. Ball had often accused the Senator of using the office as his "personal piggy bank." The feud between Leibell and Ball dated back to the 2008 election, when Ball first accused the Senator of orchestrating a "smear campaign" against him. 

On August 26, 2008, a local newspaper known as The Putnam Times published court documents surrounding the breakup between Ball and a Washington, D.C., woman in 2003. Ball blamed Leibell for hiring private investigators for the newspaper article, and for funding the campaign of his Democratic challenger, John Degnan. Ball stated both he and the woman both filed for orders of protection following the end of their relationship. In November 2003, both Ball and the woman asked the court to dismiss their complaints against each other, which was done. Ball told The Daily News that "It was just a heartfelt breakup where both parties jointly requested a 'cooling off' period, and the entire matter was mutually dismissed. My life is an open book, and always has been."

While The Putnam Times, a local paper incorrectly reported that Ball violated the order of protection by following the woman to Israel on July 20, News Channel 12, a regional network, pointed out that order of protection was filed six days earlier on July 14, and court records state Ball traveled to Israel on June 20.WC pol levels new charges against opponent". News 12 Networks. September 3, 2008. The Poughkeepsie Journal also later pointed out that there was never a criminal restraining order, and the documents printed by the Times was actually a temporary order of protection, which anyone can request.

Following the revelations that Ball's ex-girlfriend filed for an order of protection against him in 2003, on September 3, 2008, the Journal News reported that a former member of Ball's staff had accused him of sexually harassing her in a letter sent to Assembly Speaker Sheldon Silver detailing the incident. Perrault's accusations were later found to be fabrications and Ball was exonerated.

Initially, News 12 analyst Mike Edelman called the report "not credible," and many questioned the timing of the complaint, as the former staff member waited a year to write the letter until a few days before the primary election.Risinit, Michael. "More on the sex harassment accusation in the 99th". The Journal News. September 4, 2008. The previous day, Ball had released e-mails from his former Chief of Staff, which stated that Perreault was ready to "go forward with a lawsuit and 'embellish' some of the details," calling the letter to Silver into question. Ball said the letter was part of a "smear campaign", and that the ex-Chief of Staff was a "mole" for State Senator Vincent Leibell, who was backing his primary opponent. Ball released a taped phone conversation between the ex-Chief of Staff and a local political candidate, where his former deputy stated he was working for "the senate" to "neuter" Ball. Although at first, the ex-Chief of Staff denied working for the senate to The Journal News, the next day, he admitted it in another article, but Senator Leibell denied any conspiracy.

The Assembly Ethics committee met in October 2008, reaching a 'not guilty' verdictRisinit, Michael. "No evidence sexual harassment by Ball, Silver says". Journal News. October 24, 2008. and ruling that no harassment ever occurred, and unanimously voted to throw out the charges against Assemblyman Ball."Ball did not harass staffer, panel decides". Poughkeepsie Journal. October 24, 2008. The accuser, the 60-year-old Perrault, had been the target of numerous sexual harassment allegations at a prior job, where she was a supervisor."Ball cleared of sexual harassment charges". Mid-Hudson News. October 24, 2008. It was noted that Ball's accuser had herself settled four lawsuits for an undisclosed sum, at least three of which accused her of sexual harassment.

2010 election, notable votes
In May 2009, Ball announced he was a candidate for Congress in New York's 19th congressional district. Ball drew some attention by raising more money than incumbent Congressman John Hall in the second quarter of 2009. On November 21, 2009, Ball abandoned his Congressional run and decided to run for State Senate in District 40, the seat formerly held by Vincent Leibell.  In a letter to his supporters, Ball stated that the job of reforming Albany had not been completed, saying, "From property tax reform to corruption in government, the job I set to do in 2006 is still incomplete, and it can only be accomplished by continuing to tackle our nation's most dysfunctional legislature."  Ball, who was opposed by the Republican Party operatives, defeated endorsed Republican candidate and Somers town supervisor Mary Beth Murphy in a primary election in September 2010. On November 2, 2010 Ball won election to the New York Senate from the 40th district by a 52%-48% margin over Mike Kaplowitz, also from Somers.

Political positions
On June 24, 2011, Ball voted against allowing same-sex marriage in New York during a senate roll-call vote on the Marriage Equality Act, which narrowly passed 33-29 and legalized marriages performed in the state regardless of the genders involved in the union. In a CNN interview, Ball said he did not think the bill went far enough in extending religious protections for "individuals and businesses with religious objections" to marriage equality for same-sex couples.

Ball opposes drilling in the Marcellus Formation and in particular the use of hydraulic fracturing in the process. He has taken several tours of Pennsylvania with Josh Fox, the director of Gasland''.

Ball supported the temporary two-month extension of the Social Security payroll tax relief, calling out incumbent Representative Nan Hayworth for voting against the bill using class-related rhetoric, accusing Hayworth of being out of touch with her constituents.

In 2012, Ball has expressed strong support for the use of public funds to transport private school students and is currently trying to increase the distance for these children that the public schools would be responsible for.

Ball spoke out against publishing the names and addresses of handgun permit holders, insulting the editors of The Journal News, and accusing them of privacy violation.

Gregory Ball has taken a strong, public stance against medical marijuana since bills regarding the topic have come before the NYS senate after passing through the Assembly. After Just Say Now activists contacted their representatives during the week of April 1, 2013, Senator Gregory Ball tweeted , "Receiving emails, calls on "Medical" Marijuana...let me be clear: Marijuana is NOT medicine. Period. Next topic..."

In April 2013, Ball argued on Twitter that Dzhokhar Tsarnaev, one of the perpetrators of the Boston Marathon bombing, should be tortured in order to obtain information on any possible attacks in the future. He subsequently got into a heated on-air exchange with CNN host Piers Morgan when asked to defend his Twitter post.

Retirement from politics
In May 2014, Ball announced that he would not seek reelection, opting instead to return to the private sector. He was replaced by Yorktown town councilman Terrence P. Murphy on January 1, 2015.

References

External links

1977 births
Living people
American business executives
American veterans' rights activists
American real estate businesspeople
Walsh School of Foreign Service alumni
Republican Party members of the New York State Assembly
Republican Party New York (state) state senators
Politicians from Putnam County, New York
United States Air Force Academy alumni
United States Air Force officers
People from Pawling, New York
People from Carmel, New York
21st-century American politicians